Solitude is the third extended play (EP) by American singer Tori Kelly. It serves as her first release after three full-length studio albums. Kelly released "Time Flies" as the lead single on July 22, 2020. The EP was released on August 14, 2020.

Background

Kelly wrote and recorded most of the songs in isolation during the COVID-19 quarantine, in her home studio in California. Kelly stated that the process felt like going back to her roots when she created music from her bedroom as an unsigned artist.

Track listing

Charts

References 

 

2020 EPs
Capitol Records EPs
Tori Kelly albums